The Equal Opportunities Commission (EOC) is a public body in Hong Kong responsible for implementing anti-discrimination laws and advocating against discrimination. It was created in 1996 under the Sex Discrimination Ordinance as the city's first public semi-governmental body focused on anti-discrimination.

History

Background 
In 1994, the median wage of women in Hong Kong were about a third lower than that of men, and classified advertisements often limited senior positions in the private sector to men and low-paying jobs sought for female applicants.

The Hong Kong government has had a history of opposing anti-discrimination legislation. When the United Kingdom ratified the Convention on the Elimination of All Forms of Discrimination Against Women (CEDAW) in 1986, the treaty also applied to other British dependent territories. However, the Hong Kong government asked that CEDAW to not be extended to the city until it could assess its effect. It said that the ratification of CEDAW might lead to "significant economic and social consequences", and specifically, that CEDAW and anti-discrimination laws would harm Hong Kong's laissez-faire market and traditional Chinese customs that treat men and women differently.

In the 1990s, the Hong Kong government was increasingly pressured to address equality and human rights. During the 1991 legislative election, which produced Hong Kong's first directly elected lawmakers, women's groups pressed candidates into acknowledging discrimination against women. As a result, the 1991 Legislative Council asserted more pressure on the executive than its predecessors. In November 1991, Legislative Councillor Emily Lau helped form an ad-hoc group in the legislature to study women's issues. In March 1992, an inter-departmental working group on sex discrimination was created to advise the government on whether to extend CEDAW to Hong Kong. On 16 December 1992, Lau introduced a bill that called on the Hong Kong government to support the application of CEDAW in the city. The government opposed the bill, but it was nonetheless passed after all but the three ex-officio members voted in its favour.

The Hong Kong government did not act on the bill immediately and maintained that the public must be consulted first. After nine months of preparation, it issued the Green Paper on Equal Opportunities for Women and Men in August 1993. Legal scholar Carole Petersen said the government had understated discrimination against women in the green paper. By the end of the public consultation, Secretary for Home Affairs Michael Suen said that "[it] would be difficult for [the government] to come up with credible arguments not to extend CEDAW".

Founding 
Anna Wu, then an appointed Legislative Councillor, tabled the Equal Opportunities Bill 1994, a few years before to the handover of Hong Kong, which Wu believed was a window of opportunity to expand equality rights. The bill sought to outlaw discrimination on grounds including sex, marital status, pregnancy, sexuality, race, age, disability, and political and religious conviction. If passed, it would also prohibit employers from placing advertisements that specify the sex and age of jobseekers. As a private member's bill that did not affect government revenue, the Equal Opportunities Bill was tabled without government consent.

Wu also put forth the Human Rights and Equal Opportunities Commission Bill, which would create a statutory body for equality and a tribunal to adjudicate claims under the Equal Opportunities Bill. The Equal Opportunities Tribunal could cost 800 million Hong Kong dollars to set up.

The proposed equality institutions were also opposed by China. Legal scholar Wu Jianfan of Peking University and Hong Kong pro-Beijing politician Raymond Wu said the bill would violate the Basic Law, which was to become Hong Kong's mini-constitution following the United Kingdom's transfer of the city's sovereignty to China in 1997. Wu Jianfan said the tribunal was not mentioned in the Basic Law and therefore could not exist in Hong Kong under Chinese rule.

The Hong Kong government rejected the bills in June 1994 and instead tabled two other bills with a narrower scope that separately banned sex and disability discrimination. The bill on sex discrimination also sought to set up an equal opportunities commission instead of the independent human rights commission Anna Wu had proposed. Wu and equality groups criticised the decision, saying that the equal opportunities commission, unlike the human rights commission, could only monitor and settle discrimination complaints, and did not have the legal power to prosecute people who violated anti-discrimination laws.

Despite government opposition, Wu's Equal Opportunities Bill proceeded to different stages at the Legislative Council. Public hearings on the bill were held in 1995. In April 1995, Wu decided to break the bill into three, each addressing different areas of discrimination to ensure that some parts of it could pass before the legislative session ends.

On the other hand, the government on 27 May 1995 pushed to resume second reading of its Sex Discrimination Bill against the wishes of the bills committee and before amendments were finalised. The Sex Discrimination Bill was passed at 1:25am on 29 June 1995 after a nine-hour debate, during which the government and pro-business legislators stopped attempts by liberal lawmakers to expand the bill's scope by removing the Small House Policy exemption and shortening the grace period for small businesses.

The EOC was established on 20 May 1996 with Fanny M. Cheung has its first chairperson, after candidates such as Elsie Leung turned down the offer that included a salary of $157,250 and a monthly cash bonus of $70,320.

Early history 
In 1997, the EOC brought its first sex discrimination case to court against Apple Daily, which placed an advertisement for "pretty female reporters" to report on balls and social events. The District Court ruled in favour of Apple Daily, with the judge deciding that the ambiguous language used in the advertisement, placed in the celebrity section of the newspaper, meant it did not violate the Sex Discrimination Ordinance. The Court of Appeal overturned the decision, saying that allowing the ambiguous language would permit employers to advertise freely for only one gender. The court did not impose penalties, and the EOC said it was more important to clarify the law than to punish the newspaper.

On 1 August 1999, Cheung was replaced as chairperson by Anna Wu, who had been a member of the commission since its founding.

Former appeals court judges Michael Wong then replaced Wu from 1 August 2003. Supporters of Wu said her contract was not renewed because she had criticised the government as the EOC's chairperson. Wong's tenure as chairperson was short. Wong dismissed Patrick Yu before he took the post as the commission's operations director because Yu had said in the South China Morning Post that Hong Kong should enact a race discrimination law, which Wong saw as an inappropriate comment. Before joining the EOC, Yu was the executive director of the Northern Ireland Council for Ethnic Minorities. On 6 November, Wong stepped down after being embroiled in a scandal involving the dismissal of EOC director of operations Patrick Yu, who was appointed by Anna Wu, and allegations that he had accepted free airline tickets as a Court of Appeals judge. The Independent Commission Against Corruption investigated Wong on suspicion of bribery, but he was not charged due to insufficient evidence.

List of chairpersons

Powers and functions 
The EOC's main function is to implement the four anti-discrimination ordinances in Hong Kong, namely the Sex Discrimination Ordinance, the Disability Discrimination Ordinance, the Family Status Discrimination Ordinance and the Race Discrimination Ordinance. It aims to promote equal opportunities by receiving complaints and investigating alleged cases of discrimination. If potential discrimination is found in cases, the EOC can provide legal assistance, including representation in court, to the person making the complaint. It also conducts research and offers public educational programmes to promote equal opportunities.

The EOC also has the power to review the effectiveness of the anti-discrimination ordinances and propose amendments. The EOC's first Discrimination Law Review started in 2014 and had its final report published in 2016.

Controversies

Michael Wong's travel claims
It was also reported that Mr Wong had continued to draw his pension as a former High Court judge while he was employed at the EOC. The ICAC's report was submitted to the Director of Public Prosecutions (DPP) in November 2005 who ultimately decided not to lay charges.

Alfred Chen's suitability
On 1 June 2016, a concern was raised by some legislators that the newly appointed chairperson, Alfred Chen, had expressed views which suggested he was not suitably aware of the key issues necessary to execute his duties as head of the EOC. These included a dismissal of the need to address the lack of any anti-discrimination ordinance to protect sexual minorities, confusion of concepts such as gender identity and sexual orientation, and declaring that the EOC should echo the views of the government.

See also
 Human rights in Hong Kong
 LGBT rights in Hong Kong

References

External links 
 Official website
 Website of the Constitutional and Home Affairs Bureau
 Website of the Home Affairs Bureau

Gender equality
Human rights organisations based in Hong Kong
Organizations established in 1996
1996 establishments in Hong Kong
Statutory bodies in Hong Kong